The 1948 Indiana gubernatorial election was held on November 2, 1948. Democratic nominee Henry F. Schricker defeated Republican nominee Hobart Creighton with 53.56% of the vote.

General election

Candidates
Major party candidates
Henry F. Schricker, Democratic, former Governor (1941 – 1945)
Hobart Creighton, Republican

Other candidates
Clinton W. Speicher, Prohibition
Walter Frisbie, Progressive
William Rabe, Socialist
Charles Ginsberg, Socialist Labor

Results

References

1948
Indiana
Gubernatorial